This is a survey of the postage stamps and postal history of Natal. Natal was proclaimed a British colony on 4 May 1843 after the British had annexed the Boer Republic of Natalia.

The first stamps of Natal were issued on 26 May 1857. They were uncoloured designs embossed in plain relief on coloured wove paper and were imperforate. The first stamps of Natal after these were issued in 1859, with the Chalon head portrait of Queen Victoria. Between 1869 and 1895, postage stamps of 1859-67 and fiscal stamps were overprinted 'POSTAGE' in various styles or additionally surcharged 'Half-Penny'. Stamps of King Edward VII were issued between 1902 and 1909. Six official stamps of King Edward were also issued.

In 1910 Natal combined with three other colonies to form the Union of South Africa.

See also
Postage stamps and postal history of Zululand

References

Further reading
 Dickson, John. Bibliography of the Philately and Postal History of Natal and Zululand. Ilminster: Natal & Zululand Study Circle, 2007 1 CD-ROM 
 Dickson, John and Keith Hanman. The Postal Stationery of Natal. Ilminster: Natal & Zululand Study Circle, 2001  222p. 
 Hart, W.R., B.A. Kantey and A. Leslie Leon. The Postal Markings of Natal. s.l.: Printed for the Authors by Creda Press Ltd., 1977  168p.
 Mann, Eric W. The Victorian Postage Stamps of Natal. Plymouth: Mayflower Press, 1939 53p.
 Walker, L.H.J. and J.-B. Moens. Les Timbres de Natal. Bruxelles: J.-B. Moens, 1883 60p. Series Title: Bibliotheque des timbrophiles; 15
 Wright, E. C. The Embossed Postage Stamps of Natal 1857-1861 and Their Reprints. Pietermaritzburg: E.C. Wright, 1988 29p.

External links
The Embossed Postage Stamps of Natal 1857-1869.

Natal
Colony of Natal